Småländska (Swedish for "Smålandian") is the accent of Swedish spoken in the historical province of Småland in southern Sweden. The northeastern accents are mainly influenced by the Central Swedish accents while the southwest has been more influenced by Southern Swedish accents, like that of Halland and Scania. Among the most distinguishing features of southern Småländska is the use of a uvular trill  (most often realized as a voiced uvular fricative ) for the Swedish phoneme /r/.
A major isogloss runs straight through Småland in a rough line from the border to Västergötland in the west through Jönköping and to the coastal town of Mönsterås in the east, 40 km north of Kalmar. The isogloss divides the dorsal realizations of /r/ in the south and the transitional area that uses both coronal and dorsal realization encompassing large parts of Västergötland, Östergötland, Värmland and Bohuslän. North of this transitional area only coronal realizations such as alveolar trills [r], alveolar taps  and voiced retroflex fricatives  are used.

The Småländska dialect is celebrated by the tongue-in-cheek observance of Fössta tossdan i mass.

References
 Elert, Claes-Christian (2000) Allmän och svensk fonetik 
 Nationalencyklopedin, article Småland; section dialekter

More dialects in Sweden 
Västgötska
Elfdalian
Scanian dialects

Swedish dialects
Småland